In statistical mechanics, multiplicity (also called statistical weight) refers to the number of microstates corresponding to a particular macrostate of a thermodynamic system. Commonly denoted , it is related to the configuration entropy of an isolated system  via Boltzmann's entropy formula

Example: the two-state paramagnet

A simplified model of the two-state paramagnet provides an example of the process of calculating the multiplicity of particular macrostate. This model consists of a system of  microscopic dipoles  which may either be aligned or anti-aligned with an externally applied magnetic field . Let  represent the number of dipoles that are aligned with the external field and  represent the number of anti-aligned dipoles.

In the general case, the multiplicity of a state, or the number of microstates, with  aligned dipoles follows from combinatorics, resulting in

where the second step follows from the fact that .  

Thus the final expression for multiplicity as a function of internal energy is

This can be used to calculate entropy in accordance with Boltzmann's entropy formula; from there one can calculate other useful properties such as temperature and heat capacity.

References 

Statistical mechanics